USS Paul (FF-1080) was a  built for the United States Navy by Avondale Shipyard, Westwego, Louisiana.

Design and description
The Knox class design was derived from the  modified to extend range and without a long-range missile system. They displaced  at full load. Their crew consisted of 13 officers and 211 enlisted men.

The ships were equipped with one Westinghouse geared steam turbine that drove the single propeller shaft.

The Knox-class ships were armed with a 5"/54 caliber Mark 42 gun forward and a single 3-inch/50-caliber gun aft. They mounted an eight-round RUR-5 ASROC launcher between the 5-inch (127 mm) gun and the bridge. Close-range anti-submarine defense was provided by two twin  Mk 32 torpedo tubes. The ships were equipped with a torpedo-carrying DASH drone helicopter; its telescoping hangar and landing pad were positioned amidships aft of the mack. Beginning in the 1970s, the DASH was replaced by a SH-2 Seasprite LAMPS I helicopter and the hangar and landing deck were accordingly enlarged. Most ships also had the 3-inch (76 mm) gun replaced by an eight-cell BPDMS missile launcher in the early 1970s.

Construction and career 
Paul was laid down 12 September 1969, launched 20 June 1970 and delivered 23 July 1971. She was commissioned 14 August 1971, decommissioned 14 August 1992 and struck 11 January 1995. Paul was disposed of through the Security Assistance Program (SAP), transferred, grant aid, ex-US fleet hull, to Turkey 9 January 2000.

Notes

References

External links

 

Ships built in Bridge City, Louisiana
Knox-class frigates
1970 ships
Ships transferred from the United States Navy to the Turkish Navy
Cold War frigates and destroyer escorts of the United States